Anil Das Gupta (28 May 1922 – 13 December 1990) was an Indian cricketer. He played first-class cricket for Bengal and Jharkhand.

See also
 List of Bengal cricketers

References

External links
 

1922 births
1990 deaths
Indian cricketers
Bengal cricketers
Jharkhand cricketers
Cricketers from Kolkata